The 1996–97 Belarusian Cup was the sixth season of the annual Belarusian football cup competition. Contrary to the league season, it is conducted in a fall-spring rhythm. It began on 20 July 1996 with the first of five rounds and ended on 25 May 1997 with the final at the Dinamo Stadium in Minsk.

FC MPKC Mozyr were the defending champions, having defeated FC Dinamo Minsk in the 1996 final, but were knocked out in the second round by FC Dinamo-93 Minsk, the eventual finalists.

FC Belshina Bobruisk won the final against FC Dinamo-93 Minsk to win their first title.

Round of 32
The games were played on 20, 23 and 24 July 1996.

|}

Round of 32
The games were played between 1 and 4 August 1996.

|}

Quarterfinals
The games were played on 7 and 8 May 1997.

|}

Semifinals
The games were played on 16 May 1997.

|}

Final
The final match was played on 25 May 1997 at the Dinamo Stadium in Minsk.

External links
 RSSSF

Belarusian Cup seasons
Belarusian Cup
Cup
Cup